Ingebjørg Støfring (born 16 March 1945) is a Norwegian diplomat who served as Norwegian Ambassador to Bangladesh and Zimbabwe.

She studied sociology at the University of Oslo, and graduated from the University of East Anglia with an MA in International Development in 1987. She was made a Knight 1st Classe of the Royal Norwegian Order of Merit in 2007, and promoted to Commander of the same order in 2011.

References

1945 births
Living people
University of Oslo alumni
Alumni of the University of East Anglia
Norwegian diplomats